Atmetochilus is a genus of spiders in the family Bemmeridae. It was first described in 1887 by Simon. , it contains 6 species.

Species
Atmetochilus comprises the following species:
Atmetochilus atriceps Pocock, 1900
Atmetochilus fossor Simon, 1887
Atmetochilus koponeni Zonstein & Marusik, 2016
Atmetochilus lehtineni Zonstein & Marusik, 2016
Atmetochilus songsangchotei Kunsete & Warrit, 2020
Atmetochilus sumatranus Zonstein & Marusik, 2016

References

Bemmeridae
Mygalomorphae genera